Khararud Rural District or Khara Rud Rural District may refer to:
 Khara Rud Rural District (Siahkal County), Gilan province
 Khararud Rural District (Khodabandeh County), Zanjan province